Kerebilachi  is a village in the southern state of Karnataka, India. It is located in the Channagiri taluk of Davanagere district.

Hosuru 
Is a joint village about 1 km from Kerebilachi, well connected with district headquarters Davangere 37 km and also taluk headquarters Channagiri 23 km. Bus facilities is available throughout the day, both Govt KSRTC as well as Private buses.

Connectivity

Hosuru is well connected with roadways SH65 and SH48, nearest railway station is Chikjajur Junction 35 km, Davangere railway station Station 37 km, nearest airport is Harihar Airport (Private), Hubli Airport (Domastic), Kempegowda International Airport bengaluru (International), Mangalore International Airport (International), nearest Port is New Mangalore Port.

Schools and Colleges

1. Govt Urdu Higher Primary School, Hosuru, KEREBILCHI.

2. Govt Kannada Lower Primary School, Hosuru, KEREBILCHI.

3. Wisdom English Medium School, Hosuru, KEREBILCHI.

4. Govt Urdu High School, Hosuru, KEREBILCHI.

5. Anganwadi Kendra 1, Hosuru, KEREBILCHI.

6. Anganwadi Kendra 2, Hosuru, KEREBILCHI.

7. Usmaniya Degree College, kerebilchi.

8. Usmaniya Pre University College,kerebilchi.
9. Usmaniya Industrial Training Institute,kerebilchi .

10. Al Badar Madrasa, HOSUR KEREBILCHI.

Mosques

1. Madeena Masjid, Hosuru, KEREBILCHI.

2. Masjid e Ansar, Hosuru, KEREBILCHI.

Bus stops

1. Hosur Bus Stop, Madeena Circle, Hosuru.

2. Hosur Bus Stop, Tipu Circle, Hosuru.

Petrol Pumps

1. Essar Petrol Bank Patel, Hosuru, KEREBILCHI.

Demographics
 India census, Kerebilachi had a population of 8389 with 4310 males and 4079 females.
Soolekere (shanthi sagar): it is the biggest lake in Karnataka in davanagere district and one of the biggest in India, it has a diameter about 45 km, surrounded by green mountains, Bhadra canal is flowing at one side of the lake, and has a link with a lake.  By this  of land is irrigated throughout the year, lake is lined by district road around 5–6 km, feel good while travelling, and place is good for trecking.  Small tea stalls are there but not enough.  It has good connectivity from district headquarters by road about 40 km (Davanagere).  And historical Santaebennur (pushkarani) town situated 10 km from this place and recognized by archeological department of India.  September to December mid is good for visiting.

See also 
 Davanagere
 Districts of Karnataka

References

External links
 http://Davanagere.nic.in/

Villages in Davanagere district